Baraspi (also Romanized as Baraspī; also known as Baras Payān) is a village in Sumay-ye Shomali Rural District, Sumay-ye Beradust District, Urmia County, West Azerbaijan Province, Iran. At the 2006 census, its population was 375, in 64 families.

References 

Populated places in Urmia County